Amaranthus grandiflorus is a species of Amaranthus found in Australia.

Description
The flowers are clustered into inflorescences, borne in the axils.

Distribution and ecology
Amaranthus grandiflorus is found in Northern Territory, South Australia, Queensland, New South Wales and Victoria. It lives in inland areas, especially drier regions such as areas of red sand.

Taxonomy
Amaranthus grandiflorus was originally described in 1923 by John McConnell Black as a variety of Amaranthus mitchellii.

References

External links
Amaranthus grandiflorus, Australian Plant Name Index (APNI)

grandiflorus
Flora of Australia
Plants described in 1923
Taxa named by John McConnell Black